Public holidays in the Philippines are of two types, regular holidays and special non-working days.

History 
On July 25, 1987, President Corazon Aquino promulgated the Administrative Code of the Philippines. Chapter 7 of this code specified a list of ten nationwide regular holidays and two nationwide special days and provided that the President may proclaim any local special day for a particular date, group or place. Seven of the regular holidays were specified with fixed dates, two with movable dates, and one was specified to fall on the last Sunday in August. The code did not specify how the movable dates were to be determined

In 2001, President Gloria Macapagal Arroyo decided to include holiday manipulation, also known as Holiday Economics as part of the then-new government's list of principal economic policies, moving the celebration dates for holidays occurring on midweek days to weekend days. This was codified by Republic Act. No. 9492, approved on July 25, 2007, which replaced the list of holidays and special days. This act had been specified by the Administrative Code with a new list of eleven national holidays and three nationwide special days. The act also provided that Eidul Adha shall be celebrated as a regional holiday in the Autonomous Region in Muslim Mindanao. The act specified two of the holidays and one special day with fixed dates, five of the holidays and two special days as occurring on a Monday nearest to or preceding specified dates, and two of the holidays as having movable dates. The act mandated that the President shall issue a proclamation for specifying the specific date movable holidays at least six months prior to the holiday concerned. The act specified that  holidays falling on a Wednesday will be observed on the Monday of that week, that holidays falling on a Sunday will be observed on the Monday that follows, and provided that  regular holidays and special days may be modified by order or proclamation.

Presidential Proclamations issued subsequent to the promulgation of Republic Act No. 9492 established celebration dates for national holidays and special days, and established new holidays and special days, some nationwide and some local to specified localities.

Holiday types

The Labor Code of the Philippines specifies two types of holidays: the "regular holiday" and the "special non-working day".  There is a difference in the pay that employers are required to pay between the two type of holidays. There is also a difference in what is closed and in how the days are declared.

On top of these pay rules, an employee shall be given an additional 30% if the holiday falls on his or her rest day, and an additional 30% if the employee works overtime.

On a regular holiday, if the employee did not work, the employee is entitled 100% of his daily wage. However, special non-working day usually follows a 'No Work, No Pay' principle. Therefore, the employee is not entitled to any compensation if he did not work that day. If the employee works on the special non-working day, the employee shall be entitled to an additional compensation of 30% of the regular daily wage.

"Working holidays" do not have give increased compensation to employees.

Former holidays
Independence Day was formerly celebrated on July 4—the date of the Philippine independence from the United States in 1946, a date chosen because it was also American Independence Day. On May 12, 1962, President Diosdado Macapagal issued Presidential Proclamation No. 28, which declared Tuesday, June 12 a special public holiday throughout the Philippines, "... in commemoration of our people's declaration of their inherent and inalienable right to freedom and independence." On August 4, 1964, Republic Act No. 4166 renamed July 4 holiday as "Philippine Republic Day", proclaimed June 12 as "Philippine Independence Day", and enjoined all citizens of the Philippines to observe the latter with befitting rites.

In 1955, President Ramón Magsaysay issued Presidential Proclamation No. 212, s. 1955, which established the observance of Philippine–American Day every November 15, which was the anniversary of the 1935 inauguration of the Commonwealth of the Philippines. Sometime during the administration of President Ferdinand Marcos, Philippine–American Day was renamed "Philippine–American Friendship Day" and moved to July 4, overshadowing the observance of the date as Republic Day. After the Third Republic and the abolition of the 1935 Constitution under Martial Law, it was impolitic to remind the public of the old republic. This is why, when President Marcos issued Presidential Proclamation No. 2346 s. 1984, reference was made to Philippine–American Friendship Day, which was relegated to a working holiday without mention of Republic Day.

During the administration of President Corazon C. Aquino, the practice of celebrating July 4 as both Philippine–American Friendship Day and Republic Day as a non-working holiday was formally abolished. Section 26 of the Administrative Code of 1987 specified a list of regular holidays and nationwide special days that did not include July 4.

Nationwide observance
Originally, there were only regular and special holidays. On February 26, 2021, President Rodrigo Duterte announced the certain special holidays as special working holidays in 2021 under Proclamation No. 1107. This new measure is intended to boost productivity and economic recovery in the wake of the COVID-19 pandemic.

Working holidays

Local observance
Philippine cities, municipalities, or barangays, often observe one or more holidays. Being a predominantly Catholic country, these are usually the feasts of the locale's one or more patron saints.

Secular observances usually mark a government's founding day or the birth or death of a prominent native. These are often celebrated with parades, processions, entertainment, and feasting, as well as whatever local customs are traditional.

Local holidays for the most part are applicable only to the immediate area concerned, and barangay fiestas do not usually warrant a public holiday for the area unless otherwise ordered. Such holidays are usually declared as special non-working day and is proclaimed by the President.

References

 
Philippines
Holidays